Don Chisciotte and Sancio Panza is an Italian 1968 comedy film written and directed by Giovanni Grimaldi and starring the comic duo Franco and Ciccio. It is based on the Miguel de Cervantes' novel Don Quixote.

Plot 
In the original novel, Sancio Panza was a farmer who followed Don Chisciotte in his adventures because of a certain attraction. Sancho Panza imagines to make money from his companies and prefer to go around the world. In the novel, other characters appear as extras such as the baker who represents the daily life of that time.

Cast 

Ciccio Ingrassia as Don Chisciotte
Franco Franchi as Sancio Panza
Fulvia Franco as  Duchess 
Paolo Carlini as Don José 
Umberto D'Orsi as Don Pietro
Enzo Garinei as Adviser to the Governor
Franco Fantasia as  Fencing Master 
Aldo Bufi Landi as  Don Pedro de Cordova
Alfredo Rizzo as  Governor's Doctor 
 Mimmo Poli as  Tavern Customer 
Carlo Delle Piane as  Whipped Boy  
Franco Giacobini as Don Nicola 
Livio Lorenzon as The Thief 
 Poldo Bendandi as  Innkeeper 
Luca Sportelli as Second Innkeeper
Lino Banfi as Tavern Customer

See also        
 List of Italian films of 1968

References

External links

Films directed by Giovanni Grimaldi
1960s buddy comedy films
Films based on Don Quixote
Films set in the 1600s
Italian buddy comedy films
Films scored by Lallo Gori
1968 comedy films
1968 films
1960s Italian films